An annular solar eclipse will occur on April 10, 2089. A solar eclipse occurs when the Moon passes between Earth and the Sun, thereby totally or partly obscuring the image of the Sun for a viewer on Earth. An annular solar eclipse occurs when the Moon's apparent diameter is smaller than the Sun's, blocking most of the Sun's light and causing the Sun to look like an annulus (ring). An annular eclipse appears as a partial eclipse over a region of the Earth thousands of kilometres wide.

Related eclipses

Solar eclipses 2087–2090

Saros 140 

It is a part of Saros cycle 140, repeating every 18 years, 11 days, containing 71 events. The series started with partial solar eclipse on April 16, 1512. It contains total eclipses from July 21, 1656, through November 9, 1836, hybrid eclipses from November 20, 1854, through December 23, 1908, and annular eclipses from January 3, 1927, through December 7, 2485. The series ends at member 71 as a partial eclipse on June 1, 2774. The longest duration of totality was 4 minutes, 10 seconds on August 12, 1692.

Tritos series

Notes

References

2089 4 10
2089 in science
2089 4 10
2089 4 10